Teixeira is a Galician-Portuguese surname of a Portuguese family with toponymic roots whose origin is in the landlord of Teixeira, municipality of Baião in Portugal, belonging to Don Hermígio Mendes de Teixeira, noble in the time of King Sancho I, descendant of the Lords of Lanhoso, son of Mem Viegas and grandson of Egas Fafes de Lanhoso (The Nobiliary of Families of Portugal  informs that D. Egas was in the city of Jerusalem, where he came to receive from the hands of King Baldwin III of Jerusalem the Coat of Arms who use the Teixeira their descendants), was the first to be called Teixeira, he lived and was lord of Quinta do Lameiro (slough), in Ponte (Vila Verde). Not being Lord of the lameiro by the pejorative connotation of the name, D. Hermígio chose the name of Teixeira. D. Hermígio was married to D. Maria Pais, daughter of D. Paio de Novais, Alcaide-Mor (mayor) of Vila Nova de Cerveira. From this marriage there was offspring who continued the nickname to this day.

List of people called Teixeira
Notable people with the surname include:

Historical
 Tristão Vaz Teixeira (1395–1480), Portuguese navigator and explorer
 Luís Teixeira (16th century), Portuguese Jesuit cartographer, mathematician and humanists
 Bento Teixeira (1560–1618), Portuguese writer
 Pedro Teixeira Albernaz (1595–1662), Portuguese cartographer
 Pedro Teixeira (died 1640), Portuguese explorer
 António Teixeira (1707–1769), Portuguese composer
 Antônio Gonçalves Teixeira e Souza (1812–1861), Brazilian author
 Alexander Teixeira de Mattos (1865–1921), journalist, literary critic and publisher, and translator

Politicians
 António Teixeira de Sousa (1857–1917), Portuguese medical doctor and politician
 Constantino Teixeira, Guinea-Bissau politician
 Fernando Teixeira dos Santos (born 1951), Portuguese politician
 Humberto Cavalcanti de Albuquerque Teixeira (1915–1979), Brazilian lawyer, politician, musician, and composer
 José Roberto Magalhães Teixeira (1937–1996), Brazilian politician
 Manuel Teixeira Gomes (1860–1941), Portuguese politician
 Miro Teixeira (born 1945), Brazilian politician and journalist
 Nuno Severiano Teixeira (born 1957), Portuguese politician

Sports
 Alex Teixeira Santos (born 1990), Brazilian footballer
 Armando Gonçalves Teixeira (born 1976), known as Petit, Portuguese footballer
 Dimas Teixeira (born 1969), Portuguese footballer
 Dionatan Teixeira (1992–2017), Brazilian-born Slovak footballer
 Filipe Teixeira (born 1980), Portuguese footballer
 Glover Teixeira (born 1979), Brazilian mixed martial artist
 Humberlito Borges Teixeira (born 1980), Brazilian football player
 João Carlos Teixeira (born 1993), Portuguese football player
 João Miguel da Cunha Teixeira, Portuguese footballer
 José Batlle Perdomo Teixeira (born 1965), Uruguayan footballer
 Júlio César Teixeira, (born 1979) known as Julinho, Brazilian footballer
 Mark Teixeira (born 1980), American baseball player
 Pedro Teixeira (born 1998), Swiss footballer
 Renan Teixeira da Silva (born 1985), Brazilian footballer
 Ricardo Terra Teixeira (born 1947), former president of the Brazilian Football Confederation (CBF)
 Ricardo Teixeira (born 1982), Angolan racing driver
 Rodrigo Teixeira (born 1978), Brazilian footballer
 Virgilio Teixeira (born 1973), Dutch footballer
 Wilson Teixeira Beraldo (1917–1998), Brazilian physician and physiologist

Other
 Anya Teixeira (1913–1992), British photographer and photojournalist
 Armando Teixeira, Portuguese musician
 Carlos Teixeira (born 1976), Portuguese volleyball player
 Eduardo Teixeira Coelho (1919–2005), Portuguese comic book artist
 Fernando Teixeira, American engineer
 Gonçalo Teixeira (disambiguation), several people
 Henrique Teixeira de Sousa (1919–2006), Cape Verdean doctor and author
 Luis Filipe Teixeira (born 1959), Portuguese essayist and teacher
 Marlon Teixeira, Brazilian model
 Moises Teixeira da Silva, Brazilian criminal
 Ruy Teixeira, American political scientist
 Thalissa Teixeira, British-Brazilian actress
 Urano Teixeira da Matta Bacellar (1947–2006), Brazilian military officer

See also
Tejera, the Spanish-language version

References

Portuguese-language surnames